A bursectomy is the removal of a bursa, which is a small sac filled with synovial fluid that cushions adjacent bone structures and reduces friction in joint movement. This procedure is usually carried out to relieve chronic inflammation (bursitis) or infection, when conservative management has failed to improve patient outcomes.

See also 
 List of surgeries by type

References

Further reading
 
 
 

Orthopedic surgical procedures
Synovial bursae